Wiley Hardeman Post (November 22, 1898 – August 15, 1935) was a famed American aviator during the interwar period and the first pilot to fly solo around the world. Also known for his work in high-altitude flying, Post helped develop one of the first pressure suits and discovered the jet stream. On August 15, 1935, Post and American humorist Will Rogers were killed when Post's aircraft crashed on takeoff from a lagoon near Point Barrow in the Territory of Alaska.

Post's Lockheed Vega aircraft, the Winnie Mae, was on display at the National Air and Space Museum's Steven F. Udvar-Hazy Center from 2003 to 2011. It is now featured in the "Time and Navigation" gallery on the second floor of the National Air and Space Museum in Washington, D.C.

Early life
Post was born to parents who cultivated cotton on a farm near Grand Saline, Texas. His father was William Francis and his mother was Mae Quinlan Post, a person of mixed Cherokee heritage. His family moved to Oklahoma when he was five. He was an indifferent student, but managed to complete the sixth grade. By 1920, his family settled on a farm near Maysville, Oklahoma.

Young Wiley's first view of an aircraft in flight came in 1913 at the county fair in Lawton, Oklahoma. The plane was a Curtiss-Wright "Pusher type". The event so inspired him that he immediately enrolled in the Sweeney Automobile and Aviation School in Kansas City. Seven months later, he returned to Oklahoma and went to work at the Chickasaw and Lawton Construction Company.

During World War I Post wanted to become a pilot in the U.S. Army Air Service (USAS). Joining the training camp at the University of Oklahoma, he learned radio technology. Germany agreed to an armistice before he completed his training, the war ended, and he went to work as a "roughneck" in the Oklahoma oilfields. The work was also unsteady, and he turned briefly to armed robbery. He was arrested in 1921 and sent to the Oklahoma State Reformatory, serving more than a year there, and was paroled in summer 1922.

Early flying career

Post's aviation career began at age 26 as a parachutist for a flying circus, Burrell Tibbs and His Texas Topnotch Fliers, and he became well known on the barnstorming circuit. On October 1, 1926, Post was badly injured in an oil-rig accident when a piece of metal pierced his left eye (an infection permanently blinded him in that eye, and he typically wore an eyepatch thereafter), but he used the settlement money to buy his first aircraft. Around this time, he met fellow Oklahoman Will Rogers when he flew Rogers to a rodeo, and the two eventually became close friends. Post was the personal pilot of wealthy Oklahoma oilmen Powell Briscoe and F.C. Hall in 1930 when Hall bought a high-wing, single-engine Lockheed Vega, one of the most famous record-breaking aircraft of the early 1930s. The oilman nicknamed it the Winnie Mae after his daughter, and Post achieved his first national prominence in it by winning the National Air Race Derby, from Los Angeles to Chicago. The fuselage was inscribed "Los Angeles to Chicago 9 hrs. 8 min. 2 sec. August 27, 1930." Adam Charles Williams finished second with a time of 9 hrs. 9 min. 4 sec. Post earned a prize of $7,500. (The equivalent of $112,053 in 2020).

Around the world

In 1930, the record for flying around the world was not held by a fixed-wing aircraft, but by the Graf Zeppelin, piloted by Hugo Eckener in 1929 with a time of 21 days. On June 23, 1931, Post and the Australian navigator Harold Gatty left Roosevelt Field on Long Island, New York, in the Winnie Mae with a flight plan that would take them around the world, stopping at Harbour Grace, Flintshire, Hanover twice, Berlin, Moscow, Novosibirsk, Irkutsk, Blagoveshchensk, Khabarovsk, Nome (where his propeller had to be repaired), Fairbanks (where the propeller was replaced), Edmonton, and Cleveland before returning to Roosevelt Field. They arrived back on July 1, after traveling  in the record time of 8 days and 15 hours and 51 minutes, in the first successful aerial circumnavigation by a single-engined monoplane. The reception they received rivaled Charles Lindbergh's everywhere they went. They had lunch at the White House on July 7, rode in a ticker-tape parade the next day in New York City, and were honored at a banquet given by the Aeronautical Chamber of Commerce of America at the Hotel Astor. After the flight, Post acquired the Winnie Mae from F.C. Hall, and he and Gatty published an account of their journey titled Around the World in Eight Days, with an introduction by Will Rogers.

First solo pilot
After the record-setting flight, Post wanted to open his own aeronautical school, but could not raise enough financial support because of doubts many had about his rural background and limited formal education. Motivated by his detractors, Post decided to attempt a solo flight around the world and to break his previous speed record. Over the next year, Post improved his aircraft by installing an autopilot device and a radio direction finder that were in their final stages of development by the Sperry Gyroscope Company and the United States Army.

In 1933, he repeated his flight around the world, this time using the auto-pilot and compass in place of his navigator and becoming the first to accomplish the feat alone. He departed from Floyd Bennett Field and continued on to Berlin where repairs were attempted to his autopilot, stopped at Königsberg to replace some forgotten maps, Moscow for more repairs to his autopilot, Novosibirsk, Irkutsk for final repairs to the autopilot, Rukhlovo, Khabarovsk, Flat where his propeller had to be replaced, Fairbanks, Edmonton, and back to Floyd Bennett Field.  Fifty thousand people greeted him on his return on July 22 after 7 days, 18 hours, 49 minutes.

Pressure suit

In 1934, with financial support from Frank Phillips of the Phillips Petroleum Company, Post began exploring the limits of high-altitude long-distance flight. The Winnie Mae's cabin could not be pressurized, so he worked with Russell S. Colley of the B.F. Goodrich Company to develop what became the world's first practical pressure suit. Three pressure suits were fabricated for Wiley Post; only the final version proved successful. The first suit ruptured during a pressure test. The redesigned second suit used the same helmet as the first but when tested  was too tight and they were unable to remove it from Post, so they had to cut him out, thus destroying the suit. The third suit was redesigned from the previous two.

The body of the suit had three layers: long underwear, an inner black rubber air pressure bladder, and an outer layer made of rubberized parachute fabric. The outer layer was glued to a frame with arm and leg joints that allowed him to operate the flight controls and to walk to and from the aircraft. Attached to the frame were pigskin gloves, rubber boots, and an aluminum-and-plastic diver's helmet. The helmet was cylinder-shaped with a circular window. As of 2022 the suit is on display.

Attempted high altitude non-stop transcontinental flights

Between February 22 and June 15, 1935, Post made four unsuccessful attempts to complete the first high altitude non-stop flight from Los Angeles to New York, all of which failed for various mechanical reasons. The first attempt on February 22 ended just 57.5 miles north of Los Angeles at Muroc Field, CA (Now Edwards AFB). This was followed by attempts on March 15 (Cleveland, Ohio; 2,035 miles), April 14 (Lafayette, Indiana; 1,760 miles), and June 15 (Wichita, KS; 1,188 miles).

As the attempts were also meant to be the "First Air Mail Stratosphere Flight" over U.S. Air Mail Route #2 (AM-2) from Los Angeles to New York, Post also carried a quantity of 'cacheted' covers sponsored by Transcontinental & Western Air, Inc on all four flights. When Post was killed on August 15, 1935, thus ending the possibility of any more attempts to complete the AM-2 stratosphere flight, the covers were finally cancelled in Los Angeles on August 20, 1935, and forwarded to their addressees.

Final flight and death

In 1935, Post became interested in surveying a mail-and-passenger air route from the West Coast of the United States to Russia. Short on cash, he built a hybrid using parts salvaged from two different aircraft: the fuselage of an airworthy Lockheed Orion and the wings of a wrecked experimental Lockheed Explorer. The Explorer wing was six feet longer in span than the Orion's original wing, an advantage that extended the range of the hybrid aircraft. As the Explorer wing did not have retractable landing gear, it also lent itself to the fitting of floats for landing in the lakes of Alaska and Siberia. Lockheed refused to make the modifications Post requested on the grounds that the two designs were incompatible and potentially a dangerous mix, so Wiley made the changes himself.

Post's friend Will Rogers visited him often at the airport in Burbank, California, while Pacific Airmotive Ltd. was modifying the aircraft, and asked Post to fly him through Alaska in search of new material for his newspaper column. When the floats Post had ordered were delayed, he used a set designed for a larger type, making the aircraft more nose-heavy than it already was. According to the research of Bryan Sterling, however, the floats were the correct type for the aircraft.

After making a test flight in July, Post and Rogers left Lake Washington, near Seattle, in early August and made several stops in Alaska. While Post piloted the aircraft, Rogers wrote his columns on his typewriter. On August 15, they left Fairbanks, Alaska, for Point Barrow. They were a few miles from there when they became uncertain of their position in bad weather and landed in a lagoon to ask for directions. On takeoff, the engine failed at low altitude, and the aircraft, uncontrollably nose-heavy at low speed, plunged into the lagoon, shearing off the right wing, and ended up inverted in the shallow part. Both men died instantly.
Post is buried in Memorial Park Cemetery (section 48), Oklahoma City, Oklahoma.

Honors and tributes
In 1936, the Smithsonian Institution acquired the Winnie Mae from Post's widow for $25,000. Two monuments at the crash site commemorate the death of the two men and are listed on the National Register of Historic Places. The nearby Wiley Post–Will Rogers Memorial Airport located in Utqiagvik, Alaska bears their names.

Wiley Post Airport, a large FAA designated reliever airport in Oklahoma City, is named after Post.  Oklahoma City's major commercial airport is named after Will Rogers, so that both victims of the crash are honored by airports in Oklahoma City.  The Will Rogers – Wiley Post Memorial Seaplane Base is a seaplane base located on Lake Washington, at the north end of the Renton Municipal Airport in Renton, Washington.

The U.S. Army Air Forces (later United States Air Force) named a street on the former Maywood Army Air Forces Specialized Storage Depot (later Cheli Air Force Station), after Post. No longer owned by the federal government, Wiley Post Road remains, connecting Bandini Boulevard and Lindbergh Lane in Bell, California.

Post received the Distinguished Flying Cross (1932), the Gold Medal of Belgium (1934), and the International Harmon Trophy (1934). He was enshrined in the National Aviation Hall of Fame in 1969. Post was inducted into the First Flight Society's First Flight Shrine, located at the Wright Brothers National Memorial, on December 17, 1970.

In 1997, he was inducted into the International Air & Space Hall of Fame at the San Diego Air & Space Museum.

In 1979, the United States Postal Service honored Post with two airmail stamps.

Post was inducted posthumously into the Oklahoma Hall of Fame in 2004.

For many years, The Wiley Post Commission, based in Oklahoma City, presented the annual Wiley Post Spirit Award to "an individual in general aviation who best exemplifies the innovative and pioneering spirit of Wiley Post."

Notes

References
Citations

Bibliography

 Johnson, Bobby H. "Post, Wiley Hardeman." The Texas State Historical Association. Retrieved: April 3, 2009.
 Johnson, Bobby H. and R. Stanley Mohler. Wiley Post, His Winnie Mae, and the World's First Pressure Suit. Washington, DC: Smithsonian Institution, 1971. .
 Kozloski, Lillian D. U.S. Space Gear: Outfitting The Astronaut. Washington, D.C.: Smithsonian Institution Press, 1994. .
 "Lockheed 5C Vega."  Smithsonian National Air and Space Museum. Retrieved: April 3, 2009.
 Mallan, Lloyd. Suiting Up For Space: The Evolution of the Space Suit. New York: The John Day Company, 1971.
 Onkst, David H. " Wiley Post." U.S. Centennial of Flight Commission. Retrieved: 3 April 2009.
 Post, Wiley.Around The World In Eight Days. New York: Crown Book, reprint 1989. .
Sterling, Bryan and Frances. Forgotten Eagle: Wiley Post: America's Heroic Aviation Pioneer. New York: Carroll & Graf Publishers, 2001. .
 "Wiley Post.". Century of Flight. Retrieved: April 3, 2009.
 "Wiley Post and the Winnie Mae." AcePilots.com, 2003. Retrieved: April 3, 2009.
 Young, Amanda. Spacesuits: The Smithsonian National Air and Space Museum Collection.  Brooklyn, NY: House Cultural Entertainment Inc., 2009. .

External links
wileypost.org
"Wiley Post seeks New Record" Popular Mechanics, October 1934 pp. 492–494
Renton Municipal Airport - Will Rogers-Wiley Post Seaplane Base.

1898 births
1935 deaths
People from Van Zandt County, Texas
People from Maysville, Oklahoma
Military personnel from Texas
Aviation pioneers
Aviators from Texas
Accidental deaths in Alaska
Aviators killed in aviation accidents or incidents in the United States
Harmon Trophy winners
National Aviation Hall of Fame inductees
Recipients of the Distinguished Flying Cross (United States)
American aviation record holders
20th-century American people
Victims of aviation accidents or incidents in 1935